Capital punishment is a legal penalty in Russia, but is not used due to a moratorium and no death sentences or executions have occurred since 2 August 1996. Russia has a moratorium implicitly established by President Boris Yeltsin in 1996, and explicitly established by the Constitutional Court of Russia in 1999 and reaffirmed in 2009.

History

Medieval Russia and Russian Empire 
In pre-Tsarist medieval Russia, capital punishment was relatively rare, and was even banned in many, if not most, principalities. The Law of Yaroslavl (c. 1017) put restrictions on what crimes warranted execution. Later, the law was amended in much of the country to completely ban capital punishment.

Medieval Russia practiced the death penalty extensively. One of the first legal documents resembling a modern penal code was enacted in 1398, which mentioned a single capital crime: a theft performed after two prior convictions (an early precursor to the current three-strikes laws existing in several U.S. states). The Pskov Code of 1497 extends this list significantly, mentioning three specialized theft instances (those committed in a church, stealing a horse, or, as before, with two prior "strikes"), as well as arson and treason. The trend to increase the number of capital crimes continued: in 1649, this list included 63 crimes, a figure that nearly doubled during the reign of Tsar Peter I (Peter the Great). The methods of execution were extremely cruel by modern standards and included drowning, burying alive, and forcing liquid metal into the throat.

Elizabeth (reigned 1741–1762) did not share her father Peter's views on the death penalty, and officially suspended it in 1745, effectively enacting a moratorium. This lasted for 11 years, at which point the death penalty was permitted again, after considerable opposition to the moratorium from both the nobility and, in part, from the Empress herself.

Perhaps the first public statement on the matter to be both serious and strong came from Catherine II (Catherine the Great), whose liberal views were consistent with her acceptance of the Enlightenment. In her Nakaz of 1767, the empress expressed a disdain for the death penalty, considering it to be improper, adding: "In the usual state of the society, death penalty is neither useful nor needed." However, an explicit exception was still allowed for the case of someone who, even while convicted and incarcerated, "still has the means and the might to ignite public unrest". This specific exception applied to mutineers of Pugachev's Rebellion in 1775.
Consistent with Catherine's stance, the next several decades marked a shift of public perception against the death penalty. In 1824, the very existence of such a punishment was among the reasons for the legislature's refusal to approve a new version of the Penal Code. Just one year later, the Decembrist revolt failed, and a court sentenced 36 of the rebels to death. Nicholas I's decision to commute all but five of the sentences was highly unusual for the time, especially taking into account that revolts against the monarchy had almost universally resulted in an automatic death sentence, and was perhaps due to society's changing views of the death penalty. By the late 1890s, capital punishment for murder was virtually never carried out, but substituted with 10 to 15 years imprisonment with hard labor, although it still was carried out for treason (for example, Alexander Ulyanov was hanged in 1887). However, in 1910, capital punishment was reintroduced and expanded, although still very seldom used.

Russian Republic
The death penalty was officially outlawed on March 12, 1917 following the February Revolution and the establishment of the Russian Republic. On May 12, 1917, the death penalty became allowed for soldiers on the front.

Russian SFSR and the Soviet Union

The Soviet government confirmed the abolition almost immediately after the October Revolution, but restored it soon after. Most notably, Socialist-Revolutionary Fanny Kaplan was executed on 4 September 1918 for her attempt to assassinate Lenin six days earlier. Hangings and shootings very extensively employed by the Bolsheviks as part of their Red Terror.

Over the next several decades, the death penalty was alternately permitted and prohibited, sometimes in very quick succession. The list of capital crimes likewise underwent several changes. Under the rule of Joseph Stalin, many were executed during the Great Purge in the 1930s. Many of the death sentences were pronounced by a specially appointed three-person commission of officials, the NKVD troika. The exact number of executions is debated, with archival research suggesting it to be between 700,000 and 800,000, whereas an official report to Nikita Khrushchev from 1954 cites 642,980 death penalties, another report in 1956 688,503, of which 681,692 were carried out during the years of 1937-1938. (see also ). The verdict of capital punishment in the Soviet Union was called the "Supreme Measure of Punishment" (Vysshaya Mera Nakazaniya, VMN). Verdicts under Article 58 (counter-revolutionary activity) often ended with a sentence that was abbreviated as VMN, and usually followed by executions through shooting, though other frequent verdicts were 10 years and 25 years (dubbed "Сталинский четвертак" Stalinskiy chetvertak, "Stalin's Quarter") sentences.

The death penalty was again abolished on 26 May 1947, the strictest sentence becoming 25 years' imprisonment, before it was restored on 12 May 1950: first for treason and espionage, and then for aggravated murder. According to Western estimates, in the early 1980s Soviet courts passed around 2,000 death sentences every year, of which two-thirds were commuted to prison terms. According to the GARF archives database, between 1978 and 1985 there were 3,058 sentences to death that had been appealed to the Supreme Soviet of the RSFSR. At least one woman was executed during this time, Antonina Makarova, on 11 August 1978. After the fall of the Soviet Union, the Russian Federation carried out the death penalty intermittently, with up to 10 or so officially a year.

Current status

Statute limitations
Article 20 of the Russian Constitution states that everyone has the right to life, and that "until its abolition, the death penalty may only be passed for the most serious crimes against human life." Additionally, all such sentences require jury trial. The inclusion of the abolition wording has been interpreted by some as a requirement for capital punishment to be abolished in the future.

The current Penal Code permits the death penalty for five crimes:
murder, with certain aggravating circumstances (article 105.2)
attempted murder of a judge (article 295)
attempted murder of a police officer (article 317)
attempted murder of a state official (article 277)
genocide (section 357)
No crime has a mandatory death sentence; each of the five sections mentioned above also permit life imprisonment, as well as a prison sentence of 8 to 30 years. Males under the age of 18 or over the age of 60 at the time of commission, along with all females, are ineligible for capital punishment.

The Penal Execution Code specifies that the execution is to be carried out "privately by shooting".

Moratorium
One of the absolute requirements of the Council of Europe for all members is the abolition of capital punishment. However, the council has accepted temporary moratoria. Consistent with this, on 25 01 1996, the council required Russia to implement a moratorium immediately and fully abolish capital punishment within three years, in order for its bid for inclusion in the organisation be to be approved. In a month, Russia agreed and became a member of the Council. Whether the moratorium has actually happened as a matter of legal right is the subject of some controversy.

On 16 May 1996, President Boris Yeltsin issued a decree "for the stepwise reduction in application of capital punishment in conjunction with Russia's entry into the Council of Europe", which is widely cited as de facto establishing such a moratorium. The decree called on the legislature to prepare a law which would abolish capital punishment, as well as a recommendation to reduce the number of capital crimes and require the authorities to treat those on death row in a humane manner. Although the order may be read as not legally abolishing capital punishment, this was eventually the practical effect, and it was accepted as such by the Council of Europe as Russia was granted membership in the organisation. However, since executions continued in 1996, after Russia signed the agreement, the council was not satisfied and presented Russia with several ultimata, threatening to expel the country if capital punishment continued to be carried out. In response, several more laws and orders were enacted, and Russia has not executed anyone since 02 08 1996. The last person to be executed in Russia was serial killer Sergey Golovkin, who was convicted in 1994 and shot on 02 08 1996.

After the moratorium was announced and the maximum sentence was officially increased from 25 years to life in prison, multiple death row inmates committed suicide.

On 2 February 1999, the Constitutional Court of Russia issued a temporary stay on any executions for a rather technical reason, but nevertheless granting the moratorium an unquestionable legal status for the first time. According to the Constitution as quoted above, a death sentence may be pronounced only by a jury trial, which were not yet implemented in some regions of the country. The court found that such disparity makes death sentences illegal in any part of the country, even those that do have the process of trial by jury implemented. According to the ruling, no death sentence may be passed until all regions of country have jury trials.

In April 2013, President Vladimir Putin said that lifting the moratorium was inadvisable. However, when Russia was suspended from the Council of Europe in the wake of its 2022 invasion of Ukraine, and subsequently announced its intention to withdraw from the organisation, former President and Prime Minister Dmitry Medvedev endorsed restoring the death penalty in Russia.

In Russia-backed breakaway regions

On 9 June 2022, the Supreme Court of (the self-proclaimed) Donetsk People's Republic convicted Aiden Aslin, Shaun Pinner (both British), and Saadoun Brahim (Moroccan) of mercenarism and sentenced them to death penalty. The Russian media and the court claimed that Aslin had confessed to "having undergone drilling aimed at carrying out terrorist acts" and that Pinner is recognised in the UK as a terrorist for partaking in wars of Iraq and Syria. The men have said they were serving in the Ukrainian Marines, making them active-duty soldiers who should be protected by the Geneva Conventions on prisoners of war; the UN and the UK condemned the verdict, supporting this claim. The men were released following a prisoner exchange.

Public opinion 
A survey conducted by the same company in 2012 (on a sample of 3,000) found that 62 percent of the respondents favored a return to the use of the death penalty, and 21 percent still supported the moratorium. In this survey, five percent of the respondents supported the abolition of the death penalty, and 66 percent supported the death penalty as a valid punishment.

According to a 2013 survey by the Levada Center, 54 percent of the respondents favored an equal (38 percent) or greater (16 percent) use of the death penalty as before the 1996 moratorium, a decline from 68 percent in 2002 and from 61 percent in 2012. This survey found that the death penalty now has a higher approval rating in urban areas (77 percent in Moscow for example), with men and among the elderly. According to the Levada Center figures, the proportion of Russians seeking abolition of the death penalty was 12 percent in 2002, 10 percent in 2012 and 11 percent in 2013. According to the same source, the proportion of Russians approving of the moratorium increased from 12 percent in 2002 to 23 percent in 2013.

In 2015, the share of those who supported the death penalty had decreased to 41 percent, with 44 percent opposed.

A February 2017 survey showed a small increase of support, with 44 percent of Russians wanting the death penalty returned and 41 percent saying they opposed such a measure. 15 percent of respondents said they did not have any opinion on the issue.

In a 2019 Levada Center poll, found the number of Russians who support the death penalty’s return has climbed to almost 50%, 49% of Russian respondents would like to see the return of the death penalty,  an increase from 44% in 2017. 19% said the death penalty should be abolished.

Russian opinion on the practice in Europe 
After two terrorists were executed in Belarus in 2012 for their role in the 2011 Minsk Metro bombing, the Russian Foreign Minister Sergey Lavrov said that he urged all European countries to join the moratorium, including Belarus. However, he said that it is an internal affair of each state, and that, despite condemning the execution, Russia still was a major supporter of the war on terror.

Procedure 
Historically, various types of capital punishment were used in Russia, such as hanging, breaking wheel, burning, beheading, flagellation by knout until death etc. During the times of Ivan the Terrible, capital punishment often took exotic and torturous forms, impalement being one of its most common types. Certain crimes incurred specific forms of capital punishment, e.g. coin counterfeiters were executed by pouring molten lead into their throats, while certain religious crimes were punishable by burning alive.

In the times after Peter the Great, hanging for military men and shooting for civilians became the default means of execution, though certain types of non-lethal corporal punishment, such as lashing or caning, could result in the convict's death.

In the Soviet Union and post-Soviet Russia, convicts awaited execution for a period around 9–18 months since the first sentence. That was the time typically needed for two or three appeals to be processed through the Soviet juridical system, depending on the level of the court that first sentenced the convict to death. Shooting was the only legal means of execution, though the exact procedure has never been codified. Unlike most other countries, execution did not involve any official ceremony: the convict was often given no warning and taken by surprise in order to eliminate fear, suffering and resistance. Where warning was given, it was usually just a few minutes.

The process was usually carried out by single executioner, usage of firing squads being limited to wartime executions. The most common method was to make the convict walk into a dead-end room, and shoot him from behind in the back of the head with a handgun. In some cases, the convict could be forced down on his knees. Some prisons were rumored to have specially designed rooms with fire slits.  Another method was to make the convict walk out of the prison building, where he was awaited by the executioner and a truck with the engine and headlamps turned on. The lights blinded and disoriented the convict, while the noise of the engine muffled the shot.

The bodies of the executed criminals and political dissidents were not given to the relatives, but rather buried in anonymous graves in undisclosed locations.

See also 

 Criminal Code of Russia

References

External links 
Russia: Death Penalty Worldwide Academic research database on the laws, practice, and statistics of capital punishment for every death penalty country in the world.

Russia
Russian criminal law
Death in Russia
Human rights abuses in Russia